Ethiopian Journalists Forum (EJF) is an independent journalist association in Ethiopia disbanded on 24 June 2014 by the government. The association was founded on 30 January 2014 in Addis Ababa by journalists concerned about the deteriorating state of press freedom and freedom of speech in the country.  Its objective was to protect and promote freedom of speech and freedom of the press.

Since its inception, EJF was targeted by the government and other journalist associations. The association was accused of working with foreign powers, human right organizations, and outlawed Ethiopian groups to elicit violence and commit terrorism in the country. Its leaders were subjected to harassment and threats, and were finally forced to flee the country.

The freedom of assembly and association are guaranteed by the 1995 Constitution of Ethiopia. Freedom of the Mass Media and Access to Information Proclamation of Ethiopia also states: “Journalists have a right to organize themselves into professional associations of their choice." However, the government limits the right in practice.

See also
 Human rights in Ethiopia
 Media in Ethiopia
 Internet in Ethiopia
 Zone 9 bloggers
 Eskinder Nega
 Temesgen Desalegn
 Reeyot Alemu

References

Further reading

 Ethiopian Journalist Association warns Journalists Forum at TheReporterEthiopia
  “አርቲክል 19” — የመብት ተሟጋች ወይስ የቀለም አብዮት አዝማ ች? at Addis Zemen Newspaper (Amharic)
  «የኢትዮጵያ ጋዜጠኞች መድረክ» እውቅና መከልከል at DW.DE (Amharic)
  የቀለም አብዮት ጉዳይ አስፈጻሚዎች at Walta Info (Amharic)
 Article 19 associate deported at TheReporterEthiopia
  የኢትዮጵያ ጋዜጠኞች መድረክ በጋዜጠኞች ደህንነት ዙሪያ ውይይት ያካሂዳል at Addis Admass Newspaper (Amharic)
  ወገንተኛ ያልሆነው የጋዜጠኞች መድረክ at Aiga Forum (Amharic)
  የኢትዮጵያ ጋዜጠኞች መድረክ ነባር ማኅበራት የውንጀላ ዘመቻቸውን እንዲያቆሙ ጠየቀ at Ethiopian Reporter (Amharic)
 ከኢትዮጵያ ጋዜጠኞች መድረክ(ኢጋመ) የተሰጠ መግለጫ የጋዜጠኞቹና የአክቲቪስቶቹ እስር አሳሳቢ ነው፡፡ at Debirhan (Amharic)
 ሁለት ፅንፎች ላይ የቆመው የጋዜጠኝነት ሙያ at Ethiopian Reporter (Amharic)
 በቅርቡ የተቋቋመው የገለልተኛው የኢትዮጵያ ጋዜጠኞች መድረክ ፕሬዚዳንት ጋዜጠኛ በትረ ያዕቆብ ሀገር ጥሎ ተሰደደ። at Ethsat (Amharic)
 የ“ዞን 9 አባሎች”-- ጦማሪዎች ወይስ ህቡዕ ተቀጣሪዎች? at Aiga Forum (Amharic)
 ጨለምተኞቹ "ጨለምተኛ" ሲሉ at tigraionline (Amharic)
 HUMAN RIGHTS DEFENDERS IN ETHIOPIA: CIVICUS INTERVIEW WITH BETRE YACOB GETAHUN at Civicus
 Imperiling the Right to Vote in Ethiopia at rfkhumanrights
 Ethiopian Journalists Forum (EJF) is attending the AU meeting in Angola, made a presentation about the current situation of Ethiopia at Mereja
 Another Ethiopian Journalist Flees at FrontPageAfricaOnline
 Mission Journal: Ethiopian journalists must choose between being locked up or locked out at the Committee to Protect Journalists

Ethiopian journalists
International Federation of Journalists
Journalism-related professional associations
Journalism organizations
Organisations based in Ethiopia